Glenn Kesby (born 1970) is an Australian countertenor, specialising in baroque music.

Concerts and oratorio 
His other concerts have included Rye Festival, post-Restoration music at the Chelsea Festival, Lute songs at Hampton Court Palace, Handel's Dixit Dominus, Bach's Missa Brevis in G minor and Purcell's Welcome to all the Pleasures at the Shipton Festival.

Baroque encounter 
In 2004, he set up his own early music ensemble, Baroque Encounter, to stage lesser known baroque repertoire in full period costume in a style similar to the original performances.

Other 
Kesby is a regular concert artist at London's Handel House Museum, and with the Artemis and Hanbarne baroque ensembles. He has performed at the Edinburgh Fringe Festival and overseas in Germany, Hungary, Cyprus, Ireland, France and his native Australia. Now permanently settled in Britain, he is the recipient of a Tait Memorial Trust Scholarship to continue his studies with Mary King.

External links 
 Glenn Kesby's website
 Baroque Encounter's website

1970 births
Living people
21st-century Australian male opera singers
Operatic countertenors